{{Infobox person
| name         = Donna Pescow
| image        = DonnaPescow cropped retouched.jpg
| image_size   = 220px
| caption      = Pescow in 2008
| birth_name   = Donna Gail Pescow
| birth_date   = 
| birth_place  = New York, New York, U.S.
| alma_mater   = American Academy of Dramatic Arts
| education    = Sheepshead Bay High School
| known_for    = Out of This WorldAngieEven StevensSaturday Night Fever| othername    = 
| occupation   = 
| spouse       = 
| children     = 1
| years_active = 1977–present 
}}

Donna Gail Pescow is an American film and television actress and director. She is known for her roles as Annette in the 1977 film Saturday Night Fever, Angie Falco-Benson in the 1979-1980 sitcom Angie, Donna Garland in the sitcom Out of This World and Eileen Stevens in the Disney Channel sitcom Even Stevens.

Early life
Pescow was born in Brooklyn, New York, on March 24, 1954, to a Jewish family. Her father Marty owned and ran a newsstand in downtown Manhattan at 17 Battery Place. Pescow attended Sheepshead Bay High School in Brooklyn and studied at the American Academy of Dramatic Arts. Around 1973, she had a leading role in an Off-off Broadway musical entitled Poor Old Fool, though it closed after just a few weeks.

Career
In 1977, Pescow played Annette in the John Travolta film Saturday Night Fever. To prepare for the role, she had to relearn her Brooklyn accent, which she had significantly reduced for professional reasons. For this role, she was the New York Film Critics' third-place choice for their award for Best Supporting Actress.

Also in 1977, Pescow joined the cast of the ABC soap opera One Life to Live, portraying Celena Arquette. The role proved to be brief, lasting less than a year, but it helped to launch her television career, including roles on two other ABC soap operas in later years.

In 1978, Pescow portrayed one of Judy Garland's older sisters in the television biographical film Rainbow, directed by Jackie Cooper.

She appeared as a celebrity panelist on Match Game in 1978.

Pescow starred in her own television series, Angie, which ran for two seasons from 1979 to 1980 on ABC. Her primary castmates were Robert Hays, Debralee Scott and fellow New Yorker Doris Roberts.

In 1982, Pescow was cast in the role of Dr. Lynn Carson, the first lesbian on a daytime serial, on the soap opera All My Children, which she played until 1983. After her run on All My Children ended, Pescow landed the role of Donna Garland in the first-run syndication children's comedy series Out of This World in 1987, starring with Maureen Flannigan and Joe Alaskey. She stayed with the show until its cancellation in 1991.

After Out of This World ended, Pescow went on to a series of smaller roles before returning to prominent television roles. She made guest appearances on the shows Clueless, NYPD Blue, Pauly and Ivory Tower, and in the 1998 television film Dead Husbands.

Pescow appeared on the ABC soap opera General Hospital from 1999 to 2001 as the villainous Gertrude Morgan, the evil aunt of Chloe Morgan (Tava Smiley). In 2001, Smiley was released from her General Hospital contract and Pescow's character was written out. During her run on General Hospital, Pescow also had a small role in the television film Partners and guest starred on the television series Philly.

In 1999, Disney contacted Pescow about appearing in a half-hour youth sitcom for the network. A pilot was filmed in 2000, and the series went on to become Even Stevens. It aired for three seasons on Disney Channel, from 2000 to 2003. She also directed three episodes of the series, which became a flagship for the network. After the series ended in 2003, Pescow and the rest of the cast returned for the finale film The Even Stevens Movie.

After taking several years off following Even Stevens, Pescow appeared in the film One Sung Hero alongside Nicole Sullivan. She then took another brief break from acting, but she did appear in a 2006 episode of Crossing Jordan. In 2007, Pescow appeared in the series finale of The Sopranos as Donna Parisi, the wife of mobster Patsy Parisi.

Filmography
2023: Welcome to Chippendales (TV series) - Bridget (Jewellery Store) (episode: "February 31st")
2017: The Flash (TV series) – Dr. Sharon Finkel (episode: "When Harry Met Harry...")
2017: New Girl (TV series) – Priscilla (episode: "San Diego")
2013: Holiday Road Trip (TV movie) – Margaret
2012: Operation Cupcake (TV movie) – Sheila
2010: Cold Case (TV series) – Nancy Kent '10
2007: The Sopranos (TV series) – Donna Parisi
2007: Crossing Jordan (TV series) – Debbie's Mother
2006: One Sung Hero (short) – Karen
2003: The Even Stevens Movie (TV movie) – Eileen Stevens
2002: Philly (TV series) – Ronnie Garfield
2000: Even Stevens (TV series) – Eileen Stevens / Bubbie Rose, 65 episodes (2000–2003)
2000: Partners (TV movie) – Bob's Wife
1999: General Hospital (TV series) – Gertrude Morgan (1999–2001)
1998: Dead Husbands (TV movie) – Rosemary Monroe
1998: Ivory Tower – Bonnie Benitez
1997: Pauly (TV series) – Ariana
1997: NYPD Blue (TV series) – Mrs. Carol Buono
1997: Clueless (TV series) – Sheila Kendall
1996: Nash Bridges (TV series) (episode: "Hit Parade")
1994: Kenny Kingston Psychic Hotline (paid programming) with Ted Lange
1987: Glory Years (TV movie) – Norma
1986: Jake Speed – Wendy
1987: Out of This World (TV series) – Donna Garland (Main Role), 96 episodes (1987–1991)
1986: Murder, She Wrote (TV series) – Cornelia
1985: Mr. Belvedere (TV series) – Candy
1985: Obsessed with a Married Woman (TV movie) – Susan
1984: Finder of Lost Loves (TV series) – Anne Sherman
1983: Hotel (TV series) – Cathy Connelly / Gloria Beck / Susan Garfield (1983–1987)
1983: Fantasy Island (TV series) – Carol Bowen / Paula Santino (1983–1984)
1983: All My Children (TV series) – Dr. Lynn Carson
1983: Policewoman Centerfold (TV movie) – Sissy Owens
1983: Trapper John, M.D. (TV series) – Linda D'Amico
1982: Cassie & Co. (TV series)
1982: The Day the Bubble Burst (TV movie) – Gloria Block
1981: Advice to the Lovelorn (TV movie) – Janice Vernon
1979: The Love Boat (TV series) – Connie / Gwen Winters / Irene (1979–1986)
1979: Angie (TV series) – Angie Falco Benson, 36 episodes (1979–1980)
1978: Rainbow (TV movie) – Jinnie Gumm
1978: Human Feelings (TV movie) – Gloria Prentice
1977: One Life to Live (TV series) – Celena Arquette
1977: Saturday Night Fever'' – Annette

References

External links
 
 
 

20th-century American actresses
21st-century American actresses
Actresses from New York City
American Academy of Dramatic Arts alumni
American film actresses
American soap opera actresses
American television actresses
American television directors
Jewish American actresses
Living people
People from Sheepshead Bay, Brooklyn
American women television directors
Sheepshead Bay High School alumni
21st-century American Jews
1954 births